Old Crow is a low-priced brand of Kentucky-made straight bourbon whiskey distilled by Beam Suntory, which also produces Jim Beam and several other brands of whiskey. The current Old Crow product uses the same mash bill and yeast as Jim Beam, but is aged for a shorter period of time.

The Old Crow brand has a venerable history as one of Kentucky's earliest bourbons. Old Crow is aged in barrels for a minimum of three years, and in the United States is 80 proof while Old Crow Reserve is aged for a minimum of four years and is 86 proof.

History
James C. Crow, a Scottish immigrant, started distilling what would become Old Crow in Frankfort, Kentucky, in the 1830s. Reportedly a very skilled distiller, he made whiskey for various employers, which was sold as "Crow" or, as it aged, "Old Crow" – and the brand acquired its reputation from the latter. Crow died in 1856. W.A. Gaines and Company acquired the name and continued to distill whiskey according to his methods, hiring Crow's assistant William F. Mitchell to be the chief distiller. The substantial remaining stock of original Old Crow acquired near-legendary status.  After the Civil War the Old Crow logo was changed from a picture of James Crow to the current crow perched atop grains of barley. In 1875, offering drinks from the last available cask reportedly secured the election of Joseph Clay Stiles Blackburn of Kentucky to his first Congressional term.  A dispute over ownership of the name "Old Crow" was decided in 1915 in favor of the Gaines company.

Although the whiskey had been at one time the top selling bourbon in the United States, it underwent a swift decline in the second half of the twentieth century. A production error in the amount of "setback" (the portion of spent mash added to a new batch in the sour mash process) negatively impacted the taste of the whiskey, and the distiller's inability or unwillingness to correct it led to many customers switching to other brands. Parent company National Distillers was sold to Jim Beam in 1987. The Old Crow recipe and distillery were abandoned and the product became a three-year-old bourbon based on the Jim Beam mashbill. In 2013 Glenns Creek Distillery started operations in part of the former Old Crow Distillery.

Famous drinkers
Many American politicians and military leaders have been associated with Old Crow. 

Confederate General Jubal Early was a fan of Old Crow. 

Another famous politician who preferred Old Crow was Henry Clay, of Kentucky, who was even featured in Old Crow advertisements.

World War II "triple ace" Bud Anderson named his P-51 Mustang Old Crow, after the whiskey.

Senator Mitch McConnell from Kentucky has stated that Old Crow as his favorite bourbon.

Lore suggests that American general and later 18th President of the United States, Ulysses S. Grant was a fan of Old Crow. This is mentioned in connection to a story written in the New York Herald where war managers went to President Abraham Lincoln and demanded General Grant's removal since he was "nothing but a common drunkard." In reply, Lincoln asked "can you tell me where he gets his whiskey?" They replied they could not and asked him why he wanted to know. "Because if you can only find out, I will send a barrel of this wonderful whiskey to every general in the army." However, Old Crow is never mentioned in the news story and the entire concept was put into question when a telegraph operator named Major Thomas Eckert related a story about Lincoln's denial of the quote.

In popular culture
Old Crow is said to have been the favorite bourbon of American writers Mark Twain and William Faulkner. Journalist Hunter S. Thompson liked it. Twain reportedly visited the distillery in the 1880s, and Old Crow advertised this heavily;<ref>For instance, in an ad in Look magazine, from 1953.  See also this ad from Kiplinger's Personal Finance, 1981.</ref> John C. Gerber sees in this commercial exploitation a sign of Twain's continuing popularity. As for Thompson, the frequent occurrences of the drink in his writing, semi-autobiographical as well as fictional, have led to similar associations. The manufacturer actively pursued such publicity: in 1955, they took out an ad in College English, the journal of the National Council of Teachers of English, offering $250 for every literary reference to their product.

In the 1955 film I Died a Thousand Times, the dying mob boss, Big Mac (Lon Chaney, Jr.), drinks Old Crow in violation of doctor's orders.

Throughout Up a Road Slowly Irene Hunt's 1966 Newbery Award–winning novel, Uncle Haskell drinks copious quantities of Old Crow, taking the empty bottles in a golf bag to bury them at a creek. He claims the Old Crow is rare French wine, so the children begin referring to it as Le Vieux Corbeau.

In recent books in the Spenser series, originated by the late Robert B. Parker and continued by Ace Atkins, the title character regularly refers to drinking Old Crow.

Dirty Bird Blues by Clarence Major the main character, Bluesman Manfred Banks favorite drink is Old Crow.

In the History Channel 3-part mini-series Grant'', the general is seen with a bottle of Old Crow.

See also

 Old Crow Medicine Show

References

External links
 Old Crow Distillery at Abandoned

Bourbon whiskey
Beam Suntory
1835 establishments in Kentucky